Bloodhound is a  ocean racing yacht. She was designed by Charles E. Nicholson and built by Camper and Nicholsons in 1936. From 1962 to 1969 she was owned by the British Royal Family and in January 2010 she was purchased by The Royal Yacht Britannia Trust.

Royal ownership
In 1962 Bloodhound was purchased for the Royal Family at the request of Prince Philip. In February she was sailed from Plymouth to Gosport to be refitted by Camper and Nicholsons and the work was finished by June. Prince Philip sailed Bloodhound with Uffa Fox at Cowes Week in August of that year.

During royal ownership Bloodhound would accompany The Royal Yacht Britannia in the Western Isles when the royal family had their one true family holiday every year. She had a permanent crew of three, and one skipper was a descendant of Sir Francis Drake. It was during these times that the young royals learned to sail on Bloodhound. When not in royal use, Bloodhound and her crew were chartered to yacht clubs across the country at a daily fee of £1 (later increased to £2) per participant, used to expose thousands of people to offshore sailing.

In 1969 Bloodhound was sold by the royal family and Bloodhound then effectively retired from racing. Over time the boat gradually fell into considerable disrepair and very nearly became beyond salvage. However, in 2002 Richard Carr purchased Bloodhound and then later passed her into the ownership of Tony McGrail, a yacht surveyor and classic yacht restorer, in 2003. Over the next  years she underwent a major internal and external refit to bring her back to her original condition.

In January 2010 Bloodhound was purchased by The Royal Yacht Britannia Trust and is now berthed alongside Britannia in Leith.

During July and August, the fully restored, 63 foot Royal Racing Yacht Bloodhound is available from Oban Marina for private day sailing around Scotland's West Coast for up to eight guests.

Racing accomplishments

Gallery

Notes

External links
Scottish Screen Archive footage of Bloodhound

1936 ships
Individual sailing vessels
Ships built in Gosport
Ships and vessels on the National Register of Historic Vessels
Fastnet Race yachts
Sailing yachts built in the United Kingdom
1930s sailing yachts
12-metre class yachts
Sailing yachts of the United Kingdom
Sailing yachts designed by Charles Ernest Nicholson